Her Dark Secret is a 1929 German silent comedy film directed by Johannes Guter and starring Lilian Harvey, Willy Fritsch, and Harry Halm. The film reunited Harvey and Fritsch who had previously appeared together in Chaste Susanne (1926), although this time their characters become a couple at the end of the film. This provided a template for a number of popular films over the following decade such as The Three from the Filling Station.

The film's art direction was by Jacek Rotmil.

Cast

References

Bibliography

External links

1929 films
1929 comedy films
Films of the Weimar Republic
German silent feature films
German comedy films
Films directed by Johannes Guter
UFA GmbH films
German black-and-white films
Silent comedy films
1920s German films